Jennifer Todd (born October 3, 1969) is an American film and television producer. She has a first look film deal at MGM Studios and is partnered with Thomas Kail in an exclusive television deal with 20th Television. She co-produced the 89th and 90th Academy Awards with Michael De Luca. She was nominated for an Emmy for producing both shows.
She previously served as President of Pearl Street Films, the production company of actors Ben Affleck and Matt Damon.

Life and career
Todd was born in Los Angeles, California. Her credits include the three Austin Powers films, Boiler Room, Prime, Must Love Dogs, and Memento, for which she won an Independent Spirit Award for producing. Jennifer has produced alongside her sister, Suzanne Todd, also a producer. She produces the Showtime series "City on a Hill" starring Kevin Bacon and Aldis Hodge which aired its second season in 2021. She also produced "The Way Back" for WB starring Ben Affleck that was released 2020.

Todd also produced Across the Universe, starring Evan Rachel Wood and Jim Sturgess and directed by Julie Taymor, as well as The Accidental Husband, directed by Griffin Dunne, starring Uma Thurman, Colin Firth, and Jeffrey Dean Morgan. She produced (with Richard D. Zanuck) the 2010 film Alice in Wonderland, starring Helena Bonham Carter, Anne Hathaway, Mia Wasikowska and Johnny Depp and directed by Tim Burton.

Todd is a member of the Academy of Motion Picture Arts and Sciences, as well as the Academy of Television Arts and Sciences. In 2018 she was elected to the Board of Governors as a Governor for the Producers Branch.

Awards
89th Oscars nominated for Emmy, Outstanding Special Class Program

90th Oscars nominated for Emmy, Outstanding Special Class Program

If These Walls Could Talk 2, cast and creators awarded the Women in Film Lucy Award in recognition of excellence and innovation in a creative work that have enhanced the perception of women through the medium of television.

Memento, nominated for two Academy Awards in 2002; won three Independent Spirit Awards including Best Feature.

Across the Universe, nominated for a 2008 Academy Award (Best Costume Design); nominated for a Golden Globe (Best Picture, Musical/Comedy)

Personal life
Todd has two sons with her husband, actor Chris Messina.

Filmography
She was a producer in all films unless otherwise noted.

Film

Miscellaneous crew

Thanks

Television

Miscellaneous crew

References

External links
 

1969 births
Film producers from California
Living people
People from Los Angeles
American women film producers
American film producers
University of Southern California alumni
21st-century American women